Immingham Combined Heat and Power Plant (also known as VPI Immingham) is a combined heat and power, gas-fired power plant adjacent to the Humber Oil Refinery near to South Killingholme North Lincolnshire, England.

The plant opened in 2004 with a 730 MW generating capacity, and was expanded to 1,180 MW in 2009; the station was developed by ConocoPhillips until its sale to Vitol in 2013.

Description
See main article Industry of the South Humber Bank § Industrialization in "ConocoPhillips" 
A 734 MW power station was developed at a cost of £350 million by ConocoPhillips and opened in 2004 adjacent to the Humber Oil Refinery. The plant supplied 'waste' steam to both Humber and Lindsey Oil Refineries, and incorporated auxiliary boilers for steam supply to the refineries.

In 2009 the plant's capacity was raised to 1,180 MW, by the addition of a 285 MW gas turbine, and 200 MW heat recovery steam generator. In 2013 the plant was acquired by Vitol.

In August 2020, consent was given for the development of an additional gas-fired plant to be built next to the current facility. The expansion will increase Immingham's output to 1,240MW. The proposal was initially made in July 2018.

References

External links

 CCGTs in northern England

Cogeneration power stations in England
ConocoPhillips
Energy infrastructure completed in 2004
Natural gas-fired power stations in England
Power stations in Lincolnshire
Power stations in Yorkshire and the Humber
Immingham